The 2009 season of Ellada Eheis Talento is the second season of the programme presented by Christos Ferentinos with judges Ilias Psinakis, Matthildi Maggira and Vaggelis Perris. It began airing on ANT1 on 24 April and concluded on 3 July.

Greece
2009 Greek television seasons